Hakadal/Varingskollen Station is located on the Gjøvik Line at Hakadal in Norway. The station was opened as Hakedal in 1900 as a stop for passengers and freight, two years ahead of the opening of the Gjøvik Line in 1902. In 1971, the station became fully automatized and remote controlled. There is no ticket machine at the station.

Sources 
  Entry at Jernbaneverket <
 Entry at the Norwegian Railway Club 

Railway stations in Nittedal
Railway stations on the Gjøvik Line
Railway stations opened in 1900
1900 establishments in Norway
Nittedal